3-Pentanone (also known as diethyl ketone) is a simple, symmetrical dialkyl ketone.  It is a colorless liquid ketone with an odor like that of acetone. It is soluble in about 25 parts water, but miscible with organic solvents.

Uses
It is mainly used as a solvent in paint and a precursor to vitamin E.

Syntheses

Ketonic decarboxylation route
3-Pentanone is produced by ketonic decarboxylation of propanoic acid using metal oxide catalysts:
2 CH3CH2CO2H  →  (CH3CH2)2CO  +  CO2  +  H2O

in the laboratory, the reaction can be conducted in a tube furnace.

Carbonylation route
It can also be prepared by combining ethylene, CO, and H2.  When the reaction is catalyzed by dicobalt octacarbonyl, water can be used as a source of hydrogen. A proposed intermediate is the ethylene-propionyl species [CH3C(O)Co(CO)3(ethylene)] which undergoes a migratory insertion to form [CH3COCH2CH2Co(CO)3]. The required hydrogen arises from the water shift reaction. For details, see
If the water shift reaction is not operative, the reaction affords a polymer containing alternating carbon monoxide and ethylene units. Such aliphatic polyketones are more conventionally prepared using palladium catalysts.

Safety
The TLV value for 3-pentanone is 200 ppm (705 mg/m3). 3-pentanone can be hazardous if it comes in contact with the skin or eyes, and can cause irritation of the skin and redness, watering, and itching of the eyes. This chemical can also cause nervous system or organ damage if ingested. Although considered stable, 3-pentanone is extremely flammable if exposed to flame, sparks, or another source of heat. For safety, it should be stored in a flammable materials cabinet away from heat or sources of ignition, preferably in a cool, well-ventilated area.

See also
 2-Pentanone
 Methyl isopropyl ketone

References

Ketone solvents
Pentanones